Andrew Do is an American politician currently serving as Orange County Supervisor, representing the First District and is the Board Vice Chair . He is a Republican. 

Do was a candidate for California State Treasurer in 2022, but was eliminated in the primaries.

Early life 
Do fled with his family from Vietnam to the United States following the Fall of Saigon, with only the clothes they were wearing and a "suitcase full of dictionaries." Do grew up in Garden Grove, California and subsequently attended UC Davis. Do earned a JD from Hastings College of the Law.

Career 
Do served on several professional boards, including the Vietnamese-American Bar Association of Southern California and the Orange County Bar Association. 

In 2007, Do served as the chief of staff for Janet Nguyen, a politician from Southern California.

In 2008, Do was a city council member of Garden Grove, California. He was also a deputy district attorney of Orange County as well as an adjunct professor at California State University of Fullerton.

In 2022, Do ran in the California State Treasurer election, but lost to Cudahy City Councilman Jack M. Guerrero in the primaries. According to campaign spending data from Cal-Access, Do’s campaign raised $212,401 until May 21 for the campaign.

Racist abuse 
Do has been subjected to racist abuse while serving in his official capacity as supervisor. During an Orange County Board of Supervisors meeting on COVID-19 prevention efforts in July 2021, one speaker, under the pseudonym of "Tyler Durden", told Do: “You come to my country, and you act like one of these communist parasites. I ask you to go the f--- back to Vietnam," despite Do being an American citizen and living in the country for more than 46 years.

Residency controversy 
In the 2008 Garden Grove City Council race, Do's political opponent filed a complaint that he lives in a North Tustin home he purchased in 2002 making him ineligible to sit on the Garden Grove council. No charges were brought against Do. 

In 2015, Do has been accused by the same political opponent of residency fraud, stating that his primary residence is outside the district he serves (1st district) and is instead in North Tustin (3rd district) where he owns a house purchased in 2002. Do acknowledged that he bought the Westminster residency in the 1st district to meet residency requirements to run for office in 2015. However, Do denied the allegations that he still lives in his North Tustin home, but declines to state whether it is being rented out or not.

CalOptima 

In March 2017, Do attempted to become the supervisor to CalOptima, Orange County's $3.7 billion publicly-funded health insurance plan for low-income citizens. His bid was rejected by the CalOptima board of directors. Do then attempted, but was blocked by state legislators, to take control of CalOptima by proposing that all 5 board members of the OC Board of Supervisors become board members of CalOptima. When a fellow supervisor said the takeover effort was motivated by being rejected as chairman, Do did not respond and instead reiterated his qualifications to be chairman. The move was also seen as an attempt to pull CalOptima back from the medical industry and install elected-officials instead, after a former county supervisor and lobbyist gave the industry control in 2011.

Do eventually became chairman of CalOptima in 2020, making him the first Vietnamese American to take this seat. At this time, he hired Veronica Carpenter, one of his longtime advisors, to the newly-created chief of staff role, paying $282,000 plus benefits. Multiple former CalOptima chairmen raised concern given Carpenter having less than a year of hospital administration experience. 

In 2021, Do led the effort on the board to appoint Blair Contratto as the hospital administrator of CalOptima, despite Contratto lacking experience in Orange County. This caused a rare public rebuke by the Hospital Association of Southern California noting that diverging from the traditional appointment of a local leader "disregards the breadth of knowledge and experience our hospital leaders bring to CalOptima". Under Do's leadership as board chair, CalOptima has increasingly become under fire for its substantial turnover in key positions and salaries having jumped significantly (from $400,000 to at least $560,000 for the CEO position). 

In February 2022, the board abruptly fired its entire in-house legal team of attorneys and support staff in a closed session meeting.

Do also presided over and approved many salary-increases for CalOptima officers, including a 50% salary increase of CEO Michael Hunn to a base salary of $841,000 per year in 2022 and HR Director, Brigette Hoey's salary increase from $300,00 year to $512,000 per year.

Former chairman of CalOptima, Dr. Paul Yost, voiced concerns that “those are healthcare dollars that ought to be going to provide healthcare for the neediest population.” and the organization is now facing a state probe for controversial hiring and contracting practices with a report due in April 2023.

In February 2023, a day after a local non-profit news agency reported on a state investigation into CalOptima's hiring and pay practices including controversially large salary hikes, Do abruptly resigned as chair.

Pay-to-play violations 

In July 2022, the non-partisan California Fair Political Practices Commission published a stipulation revealing that Do -- while serving on the board of CalOptima in 2016 and 2017 -- has steered government contracts to two lobbyists that were donors of his political campaigns. This is in violation of California's pay-to-play restrictions. The commission noted that "Do made, participated in making, and attempted to use his official position to influence governmental contracting decisions involving a participant who contributed to his campaign". The commission revealed a sum of roughly 5,000 USD that were donated by the two lobbyist, but that Do did not disclose this or recuse himself from the vote to award the government contracts to them. The commission imposed an administrative penalty of $12,000 and that Do has "apparently" agreed to this fine.

In the same stipulation, the commission also noted that Do violated regulations on a series of behested payments for a statue project at Mile Square Park by filing the required reports late. The commission noted that "Payments made at the behest of elected officials—including charitable donations—are a means by which donors may seek to gain favor with elected officials. Timely reporting of such activity serves to increase public awareness regarding potential attempts to influence in this manner."

The commission met again on July 21 2022 to determine these cases.

See also 
 Orange County Board of Supervisors#January 27, 2015, First District special election
 CalOptima

References

External links 
 Andrew Do at ballotpedia.org
 Andrew Do at ocpolitical.com

California Republicans
California city council members
Living people
Orange County Supervisors
People from Ho Chi Minh City
California politicians of Vietnamese descent
Vietnamese emigrants to the United States
Vietnamese refugees
Year of birth missing (living people)
University of California, Davis alumni
Asian conservatism in the United States